Rachel Green is a fictional character in the sitcom Friends, portrayed by Jennifer Aniston.

Rachel Green may also refer to:
Rachel Green (scientist), American biologist
"Rachel Green", a song by Ruben Young featuring Hodgy

See also
Rachel Greene, a supporting character in the TV drama ER
Rachel Greene, a character in The Walking Dead comics